Subject matter, in general, is anything which can be content for some theory.

Subject matter may refer to:

 Patentable subject matter (or statutory subject matter), defining whether patent protection is available
 Subject-matter jurisdiction, determining the kinds of claims or disputes over which a court has jurisdiction
 Subject-matter expert, an expert in a particular area
 Subject matter expert Turing test, a variation of the Turing test where a computer system attempts to replicate an expert in a given field